The Washington National Primate Research Center (WaNPRC) is a federally-funded biomedical research facility located on the University of Washington's Seattle campus. The WaNPRC is part of a network of seven National Primate Research Centers which conduct biomedical research on primates.  The center opened in 1961, and as of 2020, houses over 500 primates.

Administration

Research Facilities and Staff

The WaNPRC is headquartered in the Warren G. Magnuson Health Sciences Center on the University of Washington's Seattle campus. In addition, the center leases facilities in the South Lake Union and Belltown neighborhoods of Seattle. Research at the center is conducted by a group of core staff scientists, as well as over 400 affiliate scientists. The current director of the WaNPRC is Dr. Michele Basso. Dr. Basso's appointment at the WaNPRC has been criticized due to her numerous animal welfare violations while she was a professor at the University of Wisconsin, which at one point resulted in her suspension from conducting research.

Breeding colonies

The WaNPRC operates an on-site primate breeding colony in Seattle, as well as an off-site colony in the Salt River Pima–Maricopa Indian Community near Mesa, Arizona for pig-tailed macaques.

From 1966 through 1996, UW operated a Primate Field Station in Medical Lake, WA, in a former maximum-security prison building at Eastern State Hospital. During the 1990s, the center was actively involving in using primates for testing for AIDS research, and in 1994 received $12.5 million in AIDS-related research funding. However, the station had several controversies due to poor treatment of the animals, and in 1995 it had to pay a $20,000 fine to the USDA. In 1996 the station closed, and primates were moved to Louisiana, Oregon, and Seattle.

Experimental methods and procedures

The WaNPRC is involved in a variety of experimental methods and surgical procedures on non-human primates.

Brain experiments
The WaNPRC performs various studies on primates' brains, which often require cutting into the skulls of the primates and surgically implanting electrodes into their brains.

A 2017 study examined the effects of fetuses not getting enough oxygen to the brain (hypoxic-ischemic encephalopathy). This study involved four macaques. While still fetuses, researchers deprived the macaques of oxygen by surgically clamping their umbilical cords for 18 minutes. The macaques were then delivered earlier than normal by cesarean section, after which they had to be resuscitated. Researchers then monitored the macaques using various techniques, including implanting electrodes into their scalps. For the first three days of their lives, researchers deprived the macaques of oxygen by restricting their oxygen input to 8% for three minutes up to eight times daily. The macaques were kept alive for eight days, during which time some macaques developed seizures. At eight days of age, the macaques were euthanized and their bodies were further studied. Additionally, researchers compared these results to two "control" macaques who were euthanized immediately after birth.

A 2018 study examined the lateral intraparietal cortex of macaques' brains. The macaques in the study had electrodes surgically implanted in their brains, and researchers recorded the macaques' neurons while the macaques performed a task in which they visually tracked objects.

A 2019 study examined stimulating the outer layer of macaques' brains (with beta stimulation). Stimulation was delivered by surgically opening the macaques skulls (via a craniotomy) and inserting electrodes into the macaques' brains.

A 2019 study involved devising a method to induce strokes on monkeys. Two male macaques were used in this study. The macaques's skulls were opened using a craniotomy to expose the brain. The macaques were then intravenously injected with a special chemical which destroys tissue when exposed to light. Light was then shone on part of the macaques' brains which activated the chemical and destroyed some of the brain tissue, thereby inducing a stroke.

Eye and vision experiments
A 2018 study examined amblyopia (commonly called "lazy eye") in macaques. To give young macaques amblyopia, researchers surgically cut retinal muscles of some macaques, and made other macaques wear special contact lenses for 6-7 months which induced amblyopia.

A 2018 study examined how primate retina perceive color. The study involved removing the eyes of anesthetized monkeys and cutting out several parts of the eyes so they could be studied.

Pregnancy experiments
A 2015 study examined uterine overdistension, which is when the uterus is larger than normal due to amniotic fluid or a large baby. Researchers simulated uterine overdistension by implanting balloons inside the uteri of six pregnant macaques. Researchers found that the balloons caused three of the six macaques to have preterm labor. The baby macaques were delivered by cesarean section and euthanized.

Lab incidents
Throughout its history, the WaNPRC has had many lab incidents and breaches of protocol, many of which have resulted in the deaths of various primates. Some of these incidents have resulted in fines and citations by the USDA.

1990s 
During the 1990s, UW's facility in Medical Lake, WA was at the center of several controversies. From 1990 to 1995, at least eighteen primates died from thirst and dehydration.From 1990 through 1994, death rates of animals from non-experimental causes at the Medical Lake breeding facility were twice the rates from simple aging. Additionally, diarrhea was a common problem among the primates, and at one point there was only one working veterinarian responsible for as many as 1,500 primates.

2000s
In 2008, the NIH revealed that researchers at UW had performed several unauthorized surgeries on monkeys. The investigation revealed that five UW researchers had performed 41 unauthorized surgeries on 14 monkeys. Komo news also reported that the Institutional Animal Care and Use Committee (IACUC) had ignored warnings about these sorts of issues.

In 2009, a primate starved to death in UW's captivity, which resulted in a USDA fine of $10,893.

2010s 
From May to June 2013, there were three separate incidents of young macaques being attacked and killed by adult macaques. On May 2, a 1-month old macaque was severely injured shortly after it and its mother were introduced to a group of other macaques. The infant was then euthanized. On May 30, a 6-month old macaque was attacked by the adult male in its group and died. On June 12, a 9-month old macaque was attacked by an adult male and had to be euthanized.

In July 2015, a USDA inspection revealed that the center's Institutional Animal Care and Use Committee (IACUC) had approved three protocols with incomplete descriptions, one of which led three primates having severe health issues and having to be euthanized. The first protocol involved surgical incisions, but did not provide information about the length or location of the incisions. The second protocol involved skull, arm, and vertebral implants, but lacked information about the size and location of the incisions, as well as what type of instrumentation was to be implanted. As a result, three of the primates used in this protocol had severe health issues and had to be euthanized. The third protocol involved skull implants, but lacked a description of the size and locations of the implants. It was noted in the report that one primate in this study had been subjected to surgery on a large portion of its skull, and as a result, the animal's eyebrow appeared to be depressed.

On December 12, 2016, a primate died under anesthesia during an MRI-related procedure. It was revealed that anesthetic monitoring records were not kept during the surgery, which prompted a review that revealed that anesthetic methods for MRI procedures were partially incomplete over the last year.

On January 17, 2017, an 8-year-old female pigtail macaque died of dehydration as the result of the water line in its cage being disconnected for two to three days. This incident was partially the result of the WaNPRC not having cleaned or sanitized the macaque's cage for 17 days prior to the incident. If the cage had been cleaned every two weeks, as is required, it is believed that the disconnected water line would have been discovered, and the death would not have happened.

In April 2018, a pigtail macaque accidentally strangled itself using a chain adjacent to its cage. The USDA reported that the chain was not installed properly. The macaque's social partner witnessed the death.

In 2019, a primate died during surgery due to the fact that it had not been fasted prior to surgery. As a result, the animal vomited and choked to death.

In 2019, a drug vial was found to be diluted, which resulted in a primate possibly receiving less than the recommended dose of analgesic. This may have resulted in the animal experiencing pain during surgery. As a result, the employee responsible for the incident was fired. Additionally, an inspection discovered that a controlled drug cabinet had been left open and unattended with a key in the lock.

2020s 

In January 2021, the USDA reported that a macaque had been left in a trapping run for 12 hours, without access to food or water. This incident was due to a mistake by the staff and resulted in the macaque being dehydrated.

In January 2021, the USDA reported that a macaque broke the locks between two cages and escaped into a room, which resulted in injuries to seven primates.

In August 2021, the USDA reported that the temperature in a room containing 14 macaques was left irregularly high over the course of several days. Although there was an alarm to alert of high temperatures, it did not work and the facility manager said he did not know when it stopped working.

In August 2021, the USDA reported that a building containing over 200 macaques had a significant amount of rodent feces in the ceiling lights and on the floor in many locations.

2021 Investigations by The Arizona Republic

Investigations

In October 2021, Rob O'Dell of the The Arizona Republic published four reports based on a seven-month investigation into the WaNPRC's Arizona breeding facility. The investigations revealed several issues with the lab, including high rates of valley fever among macaques, chemically-tainted water supplies, administrational problems at the center including a sexual harassment scandal, and the center having broken laws in transporting the macaques.

The first report from The Arizona Republic revealed that monkeys had been getting sick and dying from valley fever at high rates. The University of Washington said that at least 47 monkeys had died of valley fever over the past eight years. Experts from the University of Arizona and University of Washington said that when studying viruses such as HIV, experimenting on monkeys infected with valley fever can bias or ruin the results. The investigation also revealed that the center has had high mortality rates due to valley fever, and had to kill 18 monkeys in the fourth quarter of 2014 because of valley fever. Furthermore, mortality rates for infants was even higher, and was over 40% in the fourth quarter of 2018.

The second investigation by The Arizona Republic revealed that the monkeys' water supply at the breeding facility in Arizona, which comes from groundwater wells at the site, had been contaminated with lead, perchlorate, and other chemicals. These chemicals had been leached into the water from nearby defense contractor Nammo. Perchlorate affects hormone production and can cause improper brain development in infants.

The third investigation by The Arizona Republic revealed several administrational problems at the WaNPRC, including a sexual harassment scandal.  Many of the problems were brought to attention by a 2018 review by the center's National Scientific Advisory Board (NSAB). The NSAB review said that the center was inadequately staffed, and had four different associate directors in eight years. Furthermore, it said that the center's Seattle campus did not have enough veterinary staff. The NSAB also claimed the center had low morale, partly due to a sexual harassment scandal involving Michael Katze, a division chief at the WaNPRC who was fired for harassing two of his employees. Katze's offenses included giving one employee money and gifts in exchange for sex, touching another employee, watching pornography at work, and frequently using profanity. The NSAB's report resulted in the National Institutes of Health restricting spending on some grant until the center responded to the NSAB's concerns. The Arizona Republic report also described how the center also recently hired Michele A. Basso as its new director, whose research had been suspended at the University of Wisconsin in 2009 due to poor methodology. More specifically, the University of Wisconsin's All Campus Animal Care and Use Committee said that Basso was uncooperative with veterinary staff, and often followed poor procedure, for example by inserting unsterilized materials into brain tissue, and having difficulties with some procedures. However, Basso denied wrongdoing and was supported by many of the University of Wisconsin's faculty. The Arizona Republic report also discussed financial problems at the center.

The fourth investigation by The Arizona Republic revealed that UW had failed to notify the Washington Department of Agriculture that several of its primates being transported from its breeding facility in Arizona to their lab in Washington had valley fever, which has been rampant in the breeding facility. Additionally, UW had broken several laws as it failed to provide both certificates of veterinary inspection as well as entry permits for many of the primates being transported. Furthermore, it was revealed that UW hadn't obtained entry permits for transported primates since 2014.

Response

In December 2021, the NIH Office of Laboratory Animal Welfare (OLAW) started an investigation of UW's breeding facility in Arizona as a result of The Arizona Republic investigations and a complaint filed by PETA.

In 2022, Rob O'Dell's reporting won the Ann Cottrell Free Animal Reporting Award from the  National Press Club.

PETA Public Records Lawsuit

In 2020, PETA filed a public records lawsuit against the University of Washington, alleging that the university refused to turn over records at the WaNPRC.

During the court proceedings, the former director of the lab and experimenters testified under oath that they routinely deleted data from the lab.
In 2022, the King County Superior Court ruled in favor of PETA, and ordered UW to pay nearly $540,000 to PETA. The court concluded that the university failed to perform a sufficient search for records, and consistently destroyed evidence which made it impossible for the school to comply with public records law.

Prominent Criticism

In August 2022, five members of the United States Congress wrote a letter to the Director of the National Institutes of Health, Lawrence A. Tabak, asking for an explanation as to why the WaNPRC was recently awarded a $65 million grant despite "serious ethical concerns and noncompliance issues" at the center.

In October 2022, New Jersey senator Cory Booker wrote a letter to the Secretary of the US Department of Health and Human Services, Xavier Becerra, asking him to investigate why the WaNPRC's base operational funding grant was renewed, despite multiple issues with the center, including failure to maintain biosecurity, repeated animal welfare violations, financial issues, and failure to comply with state and federal laws. In his letter, Booker referenced revelations from the 2021 investigations by the Arizona Republic and the 2022 PETA lawsuit.

See also
Animal testing at the University of Washington

References

External links
WaNPRC home page

Primate research centers
Animal testing on non-human primates
University of Washington
Organizations established in 1961
Research institutes in Seattle
Medical research institutes in the United States
Biomedical research foundations